Sleepwalker is a fictional character appearing in American comic books published by Marvel Comics. Created by Bob Budiansky and Bret Blevins, he first appeared in Sleepwalker #1 (June 1991). He is named after his race and is the star of a self-titled comic book which ran for 33 issues, from June 1991 to Feb. 1994, with one Holiday Special. All but two of the issues were written by Budiansky, with Tom Brevoort and Mike Kanterovich writing the Holiday Special and one fill-in issue. Dan Slott also contributed a humorous side story in issue #25.

Publication history

Budiansky's concept dates to the late 1970s; however, he originally called the character Alien until the Ridley Scott film of the same name was released, at which point he abandoned the idea of using the character.

The character finally saw release in reaction to the DC Comics character the Sandman, written by Neil Gaiman.
 
A second Sleepwalker character was planned to receive a self-titled series by Robert Kirkman in 2004, but instead debuted in the 2004 Epic Anthology, which was cancelled after one issue. The original Sleepwalker's next appearance was in Marvel Team-Up vol. 3 #15, nearly a decade after his original cancellation.

At the end of 2018, as a tie-in to the Marvel Infinity Wars event, a four-issue Sleepwalker miniseries was released. The series is written by Chad Bowers and Chris Sims, with artwork by Todd Nauck.

Fictional character biography

The Mindscape is a dimension that borders on the minds of all intelligent beings and living things, inhabited by many strange creatures. Some of them are very dangerous, seeking to invade the sleeping minds of humans. The Sleepwalkers act as guardians to defend these minds and the Mindscape, almost as a sort of "dream police", apprehending such evil creatures. One such Sleepwalker was tricked by his archenemy Cobweb (who like Sleepwalker had a real name that is unpronounceable by humans) into entering the mind of a New York college student named Rick Sheridan and became trapped.

Rick himself is an ordinary human being, majoring in Film Studies as a college student. He lived in a Brooklyn apartment with his dog Rambo, where he worked as a building superintendent, doing maintenance work in exchange for living rent-free. He also earns a living as a part-time job teaching English to immigrants. Rick had an on-again off-again romance with a girl named Alyssa Conover.

Sleepwalker first emerged from Rick's mind to battle a gang of thieves. He battled dream-images of the Avengers, the Fantastic Four, X-Factor, and the X-Men. After a few confrontations in Rick's dreams, Rick reacts by tearing off Sleepwalker's Imaginator (a badge like device worn by Sleepwalkers used to teleport around the Mindscape, and to banish and imprison monsters they captured). This causes the two to become bonded. When Rick sleeps, Sleepwalker could materialize in reality or he could stay in Rick's mind and converse with him via his dreams. It was through a conversation in dreams that Sleepwalker is able to dispel Rick's initial fears that he was a malicious entity and work out agreeable terms to cohabitation.

Rick and Sleepwalker eventually worked out an understanding, allowing the alien to fight crime and various injustices. This was not easy, as Sleepwalker's appearance caused fear among regular people.

With Spider-Man, Sleepwalker battled Kingpin and Crimewave. With Darkhawk, Deathlok, Moon Knight, and the Squadron Supreme, he attempted to stop Eon's body from invading Earth's Universe; he also battled the Chain Gang. With Deathlok's help, he also rescued Alyssa Conover and a number of other innocent people from being experimented on by the mysterious Mr. FX.  He fought Nightmare, and then battled Spectra. Alongside Mister Fantastic and the Thing, he battled the Thought Police. Alongside Darkhawk and Spider-Man, Sleepwalker saved Portal from the Brotherhood of Evil Mutants. He also battled various supernatural menaces, including a demonic genie known as Mr. Jyn and the spirit of a traumatized young man that had gained superhuman powers and became obsessed with recreating the scene of his mother's murder

Sleepwalker is one of the few entities who remember the events of "The Infinity Gauntlet" storyline. Sleepwalker spent most of it fighting the villains called the Chain Gang and rescuing people from numerous natural disasters. However, the villain called Nebula turned back time, neutralizing what he had gone through. He considers his vague memories to be just a dream.

Sleepwalker played an important role in the Infinity War, helping to defeat the forces of the Magus, by channeling mental powers from Professor X, Jean Grey, Psylocke, and Moondragon through Rick Sheridan's mind. He also contributed to the battle against the evil clones of the superheroes, fighting the clones of Beast, Firestar, and Daredevil, saving the lives of a number of innocent New York civilians. Part of the fight against the evil doubles involved Sleepwalker impersonating his own evil clone.

In the "Infinity Crusade" storyline, Sleepwalker is brainwashed by the Goddess and taken to a planet on the other side of the sun. He keeps Rick asleep by drugging the orange juice in his refrigerator. During the battle between the Goddess's forces and the rest of Earth's heroes, Sleepwalker subdues Darkhawk and the Human Torch by dragging them into the water with his shape-changing powers.

Sleepwalker exchanged bodies with Rick Sheridan, and battled Cobweb, the Chain Gang, 8-Ball, and the Hobgoblin. Later in the series, Sleepwalker is revealed to supposedly be the lead scout for the dimension conquering Mindspawn race, an invasion force from the Mindscape intent on conquering Earth. However, in actuality, Cobweb had put in motion a complicated plot to invade the Earth and disrupt Rick's relationship with Sleepwalker. This involves disguising his minions as members of Sleepwalker's race and framing his archenemy as their leader. The plot is only partially successful; Sleepwalker and the Avengers thwart the initial attack, although Sleepwalker's reputation was ruined in the process. Many people still mistakenly believe that Sleepwalker's race planned to invade and conquer the Earth and that Sleepwalker himself was an advanced scout for the invasion force, betraying his own people to protect humanity.

During the confrontation, Sleepwalker pretended to destroy Rick's mind as a means of protecting him from Cobweb's minions. Unfortunately, the authorities retrieved the "mindrake" weapon Sleepwalker had used to store Rick's mind, preventing the alien from recovering it, also gathering up one of Cobweb's demons that was left behind after the Avengers drove them away. The demon and the mindrake were both taken to a federal prison and research facility where serial killer Jeremy Roscoe was also being held as part of a psychiatric experiment. Roscoe staged an escape from the prison hospital and became fused with the demon in the process, transforming into a nightmarish creature calling himself Psyko. The monster began spreading mass insanity across New York, until Sleepwalker managed to defeat him and retrieve the mindrake Psyko had taken with him.

Later, Sleepwalker thwarts Cobweb's second attack and banishes his archenemy once and for all, before seemingly dying to save Rick Sheridan's life. However, Sleepwalker would later turn up alive and still trapped in Rick's mind.

Sleepwalker eventually gains the ability to interact with the real world again. He is seen investigating the after-effects of an explosion caused by the villainous Ringmaster. He had attempted to become more involved in the situation but was foiled by Rick's sleeping schedule.

Sleepwalker is seen as having become a registered superhuman under the Initiative after Alyssa Conover's death in an auto accident. He then appears alongside Machine Man and Agent Sum as a member of Ms. Marvel's Operation: Lightning Storm (by default, his human host Rick Sheridan becomes an unofficial member as well).

During the Fantastic Four's confrontation with the Quiet Man, they recruited Sleepwalker's assistance to neutralize the threat posed by the heroes from Counter-Earth, reasoning that Sleepwalker was particularly suited to advise them on it, since Counter-Earth was basically Franklin Richards' dream. During his time on Counter-Earth, Sleepwalker noted that none of the human inhabitants there were real, as they did not have actual souls, allowing the FF to freely take them out, as they were not actually killing anyone.

Powers and abilities
Sleepwalker possesses superhuman strength, exceptional durability and resistance to injury, and flotation-like flight. He is also capable of the projection of crude images of what he's seen from his eyes. His only offensive power was his "warp gaze". With this vision-based power, Sleepwalker could alter the shape of physical objects and twist them to his purposes. He could also modify the physical characteristics of the objects he affected-making them harder or softer, for example. Sleepwalker initially demonstrated this power by using it to distort a sidewalk to capture a criminal. He also used this ability once on air molecules to create a wind tunnel for faster aerial travel. Owing to an oath sworn by all members of his race due to the great physical and mental pain it could cause, Sleepwalker tried not to use his warp beams on living entities.

The effects of the warp vision on living entities was demonstrated when Rick, trapped in Sleepwalker's body after an encounter with the Chain Gang, inadvertently used the beam on his former girlfriend Alyssa Conover, who was about to kill Sleepwalker in Rick's body. Sleepwalker's vision causes living bodies to twist and contort, causing intense physical agony in the process, although this effect is only temporary. The beam also has the side effect of breaking the mental control of any outside entity possessing the victim's mind, expelling the controller in the process. As a result, Rick unintentionally freed Alyssa from the domination of the Chain Gang, a tactic Sleepwalker himself would later adopt when freeing other people from the mental enslavement of Cobweb's minions, using his ability to detect mental enslavement to identify the humans who needed his help. In these cases, when he used his warp beams on their human victims, the humans suffered little to no mental trauma, only experiencing a mild shock that they quickly recovered from. Alyssa Conover, on the other hand, suffered both the physical pain of her contortion and a serious mental shock from the effects of Sleepwalker's warp beams, which according to Sleepwalker forced her to repeatedly experience her worst nightmares. It seems that the mindspawn demons, who had completely suppressed the wills of their human victims and had completely taken over their bodies, took the brunt of the blast. In Alyssa's case, on the other hand, the Chain Gang did not completely take over her body, but rather attempted to force her conscious mind to do their bidding, leaving her vulnerable to the full effects of the beam.

Sleepwalker's warp vision had different effects on demons and other extraplanar creatures not from Earth, often incapacitating and banishing them back to their native planes, as he did to dispatch Cobweb's minions back to the Mindscape and also to defeat Mr. Jyn. His ability to use his warp-beam diminishes as he uses it; the greater the intensity of its usage, the faster it is used up. His warp-beam power is replenished by rest.

As an alien resident of the Mindscape, Sleepwalker had exceptional visual abilities, being able to see over a much farther distance than an average human, as well as being able to see and follow energy trails, and see wavelength colors invisible to human eyes. Sleepwalker shares a mental link with the human Rick Sheridan that facilitates Sleepwalker's entry into Rick's mind. Instead of food, Sleepwalker fed on mental energy, needing to periodically return to Rick's mind to be able to regain his strength. When Rick appeared to be dead, Sleepwalker formed a temporary bond with a homeless man named Pike to borrow some of his mental energy, although he did this only with Pike's express permission. His training as a warrior of the Mindscape makes him skilled tracker and an expert in the combat use of his powers, and also gives him a certain amount of knowledge about various supernatural entities and the workings of the mind. Sleepwalker's presence could also strengthen the powers of psychic powers and mind-related magic, enhancing the mental abilities of Professor X, Moondragon, Jean Grey and Psylocke, enabling them to connect with the mind of every human on Earth to free the human race from mental enslavement by the Magus. Similarly, Sleepwalker's mere presence increased the power of Doctor Strange's mental spells and enabled him to imprison a mental demon released from a woman's mind by Nightmare. Continuing his supernatural 'expertise', Sleepwalker's nature also allows him to be aware of souls, allowing him to confirm that the natives of Counter-Earth did not have souls as they were nothing more than psychic manifestations created by Franklin Richards; he was also able to confirm that Jim Hammond had a soul despite his artificial origin.

Being a resident of the mental plane also gives Sleepwalker a resistance, but not an immunity, to various mental attacks.  When battling the monster Psyko, a creature that had the power to instill madness in his opponents, Sleepwalker briefly suffered from insanity, although he managed to resist and overcome Psyko's madness to finally defeat him. At the same time, Sleepwalker was shown as able to absorb the energy of the attack and use it to increase his own strength and power, although he still suffered its effects.

Sleepwalker had several notable weaknesses. The first was his bond to Rick—whenever Rick awoke or regained consciousness, Sleepwalker would automatically disappear from the human world and return to Rick's mind. At the same time, Sleepwalker's strength was related to his connection with the ground and the Earth—the higher he levitated, the greater his loss of strength, although he gained his full strength when actually standing on the ground itself. Similarly, Sleepwalker would weaken if he did not return to the mental plane or Rick's mind to rest and renew his supply of mental energy, which happened both when Rick was killed during the Infinity Gauntlet and when Rick seemed to be dead (actually a ruse by Sleepwalker to protect him from Cobweb's minions). Prolonged stay on Earth can lead to death. Finally, upon being exposed to a certain frequency of light, Sleepwalker initially experienced hallucinations and other pleasurable effects that distracted him from his frustration and anger at being hated and rejected by humans, despite his attempts to help them. He became addicted to the light, using it to escape his problems in a way similar to drug abuse or alcoholism. Sleepwalker's obsession with the light had tragic consequences, including the creation of Spectra and putting Rick into a coma. Horrified at what he had done, Sleepwalker managed to overcome his addiction and saved Rick's mind from the invasion of the Thought Police.

Sleepwalker also used the Imaginator device, which was in the shape of an amulet. The Imaginator was capable of teleporting Sleepwalker and other targets into, out of, and to different locations within the Mindscape. Sleepwalker's Imaginator was at one point lost within the mind of Rick Sheridan.

Enemies
Sleepwalker possessed a colorful gallery of mostly original villains, with a new one introduced each issue during the title's beginnings. They include:

 Jeff Hagees / 8-Ball: A criminal who based his costume and equipment on the game of pool.
 Nelson Gruber / Bookworm: An angry, bitter social misfit who gained the ability to channel energy from the Mindscape into creations of whatever he read after an encounter with Sleepwalker, and used his abilities to get revenge on his tormentors.
 The Chain Gang: Four convicted felons linked together in a chain gang who escaped during the upheavals caused by the Infinity Gauntlet, gaining superhuman powers in an accident, that lasted only as long as they stayed chained together. It consists of Master Link (Willis Hayworth), Missing Link (Ray Morgan), Uplink (Hector Fuentes), and Weak Link (Ernest Mills).
 Mr. FX: A mysterious special effects designer who was known for his stunningly lifelike displays, which he actually achieved by kidnapping people and imprisoning them within specially designed costumes.
 Nightmare: Usually a Doctor Strange villain, Sleepwalker faced off against the living embodiment of bad dreams. He promised the reward of sending Sleepwalker back to his home realm, but he fought back when he threatened Rick Sheridan.
 Selena Slate / Spectra: The assistant of a scientist who was studying the properties of a strange form of diamond, and planned to steal it and split the proceeds with her junkie boyfriend, until Sleepwalker's obsession with the light produced by the diamond led her to be imbued with its energies, allowing her to emit a rainbow of colored lights with many different powers.
 Mr. Jyn: A demonic genie that tricked humans into letting him manifest on Earth by pretending to serve them, even as he manipulated them into letting him cause more and more mayhem until he would be released.
 Edward "Eddie" Cicala: A young boy traumatized by his father murdering his mother, who became catatonic before his mind made contact with a malign energy force from the Mindscape, which allowed him to possess innocent people and make them kill each other in a re-creation of his mother's death.
 Cobweb: Sleepwalker's nemesis, a demon of the Mindscape that could cause madness in his human victims, responsible for trapping Sleepwalker in Rick Sheridan's mind as part of a plot to invade Earth without being thwarted by his enemy.
 Felicity Hopkins / Lullaby: A teenage mutant who discovered she had the ability to sing people to sleep and put them into zombie-like trances, where they would obey her every command.
 Carl Wilkinson / Crimewave: A crime boss who plotted to embarrass the Kingpin and replace him as the top crime lord on the East Coast by capturing Spider-Man.
 The Thought Police: A special team of government agents assembled to capture Sleepwalker, led by the obsessed Agent Tolliver Smith.
 Jeremy Roscoe / Psyko: A human serial killer who became fused with a monster from the Mindscape and transformed into a hideous creature with warping powers similar to Sleepwalker's and the additional power to cause insanity in his opponents and victims.
 
Sleepwalker's original villains faded into obscurity faster than Sleepwalker himself and haven't been seen since the end of the series, save for 8-Ball who appeared briefly in the 2005 She-Hulk series and the Daughters of the Dragon miniseries.

Sleepwalker also battled the Hobgoblin and teamed up with Darkhawk and Spider-Man to battle the Brotherhood of Mutants to rescue the mutant Portal.

Other versions

Marvel Team-Up: League of Losers
Sleepwalker features in an arc of Robert Kirkman's Marvel Team-Up vol. 3, featuring a group of C-list heroes dubbed "The League of Losers". A group of heroes including Sleepwalker, Darkhawk, Dagger, Araña, X-23, Gravity, and Terror go to the future to prevent the villain Chronok from stealing Reed Richards' time machine, (Chronok comes to the present after killing all of Marvel's major heroes). Although Araña dies along the way, the rest of the team succeeds.

It is revealed Chronok is from the same time period as Kirkman's Mutant 2099; the group stays with him and his mentor Reed Richards to wait for Chronok. During this time, Sleepwalker experiences difficulties with being away from his host Rick Sheridan, but ultimately comes to terms with it. The team defeats Chronok, but at the end of the story, Richards reveals they can't go back to their present, due to time travel and alternate timelines. The group decides to stay in the future, satisfied with the impact they made, however unnoticed. Mutant 2099 suggests reforming the Avengers or the "Fantastic Nine".

Note that due to the Marvel Universe's method for resolving time travel paradoxes, this story occurred in an alternate universe.

Marvel Zombies: Dead Days
Sleepwalker is shown among the surviving heroes in the Dead Days prequel to Marvel Zombies, during the meeting on the Helicarrier. This is the last time he is seen however, and Rick's sleeping body is killed.

Ultimate Sleepwalker
Ultimate Sleepwalker was seen in Ultimate X-Men #89 (February 2008); there, he is shown to be not one man, but a group of creatures that police the "mindscape" on which Amahl Farouk grew to become the Shadow King.

The Wozuans
"The Anatomy of a Nightmare" in Tales of Suspense #22 (Oct. 1961) by Stan Lee and Steve Ditko features an alien race bearing a strong resemblance to the Sleepwalkers. The story was reprinted in Monsters on the Prowl #18 (Aug. 1972). The main character was hidden in shadows and takes pills to give him nightmares; his appearance is revealed to be the same as the aliens he visits, the Wozuans. He is finally revealed to be a green-skinned alien complaining that the pills failed to show him anything other than his own world.

Other appearances

 Sleepwalker made a cameo as a part of Deathlok's team in the 2006 Beyond! miniseries.
 He was seen briefly in a six issue Spider-Man miniseries, Revenge of the Sinister Six.
 Sleepwalker made a brief cameo in the 2005 Great Lakes Avengers (GLA) Misassembled.
 Sleepwalker also appears in the preview image for Avengers: The Initiative #1.
 Sleepwalker appeared in Secret Defenders #4, #5, fighting Roadkill, and made a cameo in the final issue, #25
 As part of the Infinity Wars, Sleepwalker had a cameo in Doctor Strange: Sorcerer Supreme #46
 As well as appearing in the main Infinity Crusade series, Sleepwalker had a cameo in The Mighty Thor #464
 Two creatures slightly resembling Sleepwalker appear in Ultimate X-Men #89. It is revealed they are "policing" the mindscape reality Amahl Farouk (the Shadow King) finds himself trapped in with an iron hand, causing more trouble than actually protecting it.
 Sleepwalker had a cameo in Ms. Marvel #18.
 Sleepwalker can also be seen on the cover of the Irredeemable Ant-Man #12. This final issue of the canceled series, shows other characters doomed to obscurity.
 Sleepwalker teams up with the Superior Spider-Man in Avenging Spider-Man #19.

Collected editions

References

External links
 Sleepwalker at the Marvel Universe
 Characters from the Sleepwalker series at the Appendix to the Handbook of the Marvel Universe
 

1991 comics debuts
Characters created by Bob Budiansky
Comics characters introduced in 1991
Marvel Comics characters with superhuman strength
Marvel Comics superheroes
Marvel Comics titles